Índia is the fourth studio album by Brazilian singer Gal Costa, released on 1973 by Philips Records. Its major hits were "Índia", "Volta" and "Desafinado".

Music
Índia is an MPB album, with influences from tropicália, folk, psychedelic, jazz, funk and rock.

Artwork
The artwork depicts Gal Costa semi-nude with indigenous Brazilian vests. It was originally censored by the Brazilian military government, but the full artwork was released by Costa in 2015. She stated in her Instagram: "To our delight, including mine".

Release
The album was released on 1973 by Philips Records, and reissued with the original uncensored cover in 2017, by Mr Bongo Records.

Reception

Índia received widespread acclaim by critics.

Track listing

Personnel
Adapted from AllMusic.

 Guilherme Araújo — production
 Edú Mello e Souza — studio directing
 Luigi Hoffer — technician, mixing 
 Marcus Vinicius — technician, mixing
 Ary Carvalhaes — mixing
 Gilberto Gil — musical directing, acoustic guitar, 12-string acoustic guitar
 Antonio Guerreiro — photograph
 Waly Salomão — artwork
 Dominguinhos — accordion
 Toninho Horta — electric guitar
 Luiz Alves — contrabass
 Roberto Silva — drums
 Chico Batera — percussion and special effects
 Rogério Duprat — arrangement
 Arthur Verocai — arrangement 
 Mario Tavares — strings 
 Tenório Jr. — organ 
 Roberto Menescal — acoustic guitar 
 Wagner Tiso — organ 
 Chacal — percussion 
 Antônio Carlos Jobim — composing
 Jards Macalé — composing
 Luiz Melodia — composing
 Newton Mendonça — composing
 Lupicínio Rodrigues — composing
 José Asunción Flores — composing

References

1973 albums
Gal Costa albums
Philips Records albums